The Brynmor Jones Library (BJL) is the main library at the University of Hull, England. In 1967 it was named after Sir Brynmor Jones (1903-1989) who initiated research in the field of Liquid Crystals (LCD) at Hull and became Head of the Department of Chemistry in 1947.  He was the Vice-Chancellor of the University from 1956 to 1972.

The building consists of two main sections, the older Art Deco style entrance and front section, built in the 1950s, which is five floors high (originally three which were later subdivided by mezzanines) and the newer extension, completed in 1970, which consists of eight floors plus a basement. The older section has two exterior bas-relief sculptures by Willi Soukop, one is of an owl, the other shows a human figure representing the light of knowledge and is positioned directly over the main entrance. The new section has views over the Humber with three lifts for student use and a fourth lift for staff. It contains over a million books, plus other reference materials, mainly for use by students at the university. There are also a large number of open access computers within the library which are connected to the University network.

The poet Philip Larkin served as Librarian here for thirty years from 1955 until his death in 1985.

The library serves as home to the university's Art Collection, started in 1963 the collection's focus is British art from 1890 to 1940, including works by the Bloomsbury and Camden Town Groups.

References

External links 

Brynmor Jones Library website
Hull Uni Library on Twitter

Academic libraries in England
University of Hull
Art Deco architecture in England
Library buildings completed in 1969
Buildings and structures in Kingston upon Hull
Libraries in the East Riding of Yorkshire